Beavis and Butt-Head is an American adult animated television series created by Mike Judge for MTV (seasons 1–8) and later Paramount+ (season 9, as Mike Judge's Beavis and Butt-Head). The series follows Beavis and Butt-Head, both voiced by Judge, a pair of teenage slackers characterized by their apathy, lack of intelligence, lowbrow humor, and love for hard rock and heavy metal music.

The characters originated in Judge's 1992 short film Frog Baseball, which was broadcast by MTV's animation showcase Liquid Television. After MTV commissioned a full series, Beavis and Butt-Head ran for seven seasons from 1993 to 1997. It was revived with an eighth season aired on MTV in 2011. A second revival, consisting of an initial two-season order, premiered on Paramount+ in 2022.

During its initial run, Beavis and Butt-Head received critical acclaim for its satirical, scathing commentary on society, as well as criticism for its alleged influence on adolescents. It produced various other media, including the theatrical film Beavis and Butt-Head Do America in 1996. A second film, Beavis and Butt-Head Do the Universe, was released in 2022 on Paramount+.

Premise

Beavis and Butt-Head are unintelligent teenage boys who live in the town of Highland, Texas. Rolling Stone described them as "thunderously stupid and excruciatingly ugly". They spend time watching television, smoking marijuana, drinking unhealthy beverages, eating, and embarking on "mundane, sordid" adventures, which often involve vandalism, abuse, violence, or animal cruelty. According to The Baltimore Sun, Beavis and Butt-Head are "at their most incorrect when it comes to sexuality and matters of gender. The nicest thing you can say about them in this regard is that they are budding misogynists." When Beavis consumes too much caffeine or sugar, he becomes Cornholio, a hyperactive alter ego. Over the course of the series, Beavis and Butt-Head developed more distinct personalities; Butt-Head is the leader and "devious visionary", while Beavis, the sidekick, is the "loose cannon".

Most episodes integrate sequences where Beavis and Butt-Head watch music videos and offer commentary. They prefer videos with "explosions, loud guitars, screaming and death", and favor rock bands such as the Butthole Surfers, Corrosion of Conformity, and Metallica. Judge said he saw Beavis and Butt-Head as "pretty positive characters, generally speaking ... They usually think everything's pretty cool. Or, in one way or another, everything sucks." He said his perception of the characters changed over the years: "When I first started out with the first show, which was Frog Baseball, they were just two guys that I would definitely want to keep my distance from ... But, by the end of the series, I would think that two guys like that would at least be fun to sit and watch TV with."

Voice cast
 Mike Judge as Beavis, Butt-Head, Principal McVicker, Coach Buzzcut, David Van Driessen, Tom Anderson, Todd, and others
 Tracy Grandstaff as Daria Morgendorffer and Mrs. Stevenson
 Kristofer Brown as various

History

1993–1997: First seven seasons and first film

Beavis and Butt-Head was created by the American animator Mike Judge for his short film Frog Baseball, which was played on MTV's animation showcase Liquid Television. MTV ordered a full series, which ran for seven seasons from March 8, 1993, to November 28, 1997. Judge is critical of the animation in earlier episodes, in particular the first two—"Give Blood/Blood Drive" and "Door to Door"—which he described as "Horrible. Those first two episodes were awful, I don't know why anybody liked it... I was burying my head in the sand." In addition, the studio that worked on the first season was supposed to have 22 episodes done by March 8, 1993, and only had two finished ("Give Blood/Blood Drive" and "Door to Door").

In 1993, Rolling Stone described Beavis and Butt-Head as the "biggest phenomenon on MTV since the heyday of Michael Jackson". In Time, Kurt Andersen wrote that Beavis and Butt-Head "may be the bravest show ever run on national television". In 1997, Judge said the show was "my reaction to the whole fringe aspects of the political correctness movement". Beavis and Butt-Head became pop culture icons and their sniggering and dialogue became catchphrases.

From 1994 to 1996, Marvel Comics published a monthly Beavis and Butt-Head comic under the Marvel Absurd imprint by a variety of writers, but with each issue drawn by artist Rick Parker. It was also reprinted by Marvel UK, which created new editorial material.

A theatrical film, Beavis and Butt-Head Do America, released in the US 1996 and later in the UK and Europe in 1997. It features the voices of Bruce Willis, Demi Moore, Cloris Leachman, Robert Stack, Eric Bogosian, Richard Linklater, Greg Kinnear (in an uncredited role) and David Letterman (credited as Earl Hofert). It opened at number one at the US box office and grossed more than $60 million

2011: Eighth season
On July 14, 2010, a spokesperson for MTV Networks informed a New York Post reporter that Mike Judge was creating a new Beavis and Butt-Head series, that Judge would reprise his voice-acting roles for the show, and that the animation would be hand-drawn. According to TMZ, MTV had not asked Tracy Grandstaff to reprise her role as Daria Morgendorffer. Later, in a Rolling Stone interview, Judge was asked if Daria was coming back, and he said: "No. There's sort of a cameo in one episode. That'll be a surprise."

As in the old series, Beavis and Butt-Head are high school students who, among other things, criticize contemporary music videos. In an interview with Rolling Stone, MTV president Van Toffler said the duo would also watch Jersey Shore, Ultimate Fighting Championship matches, and amateur videos from YouTube, as well as give movie reviews. "The biggest change is obviously the references are updated, it's set in modern day, and there's going to be a movie review segment," Linn said, "Otherwise they're still true to their prior passions."

John Altschuler, formerly a writer for King of the Hill, told a Rolling Stone reporter that he saw signs that Mike Judge was thinking of reviving Beavis and Butt-Head. On more than one occasion, Judge told the writers that one of their ideas for an episode of King of the Hill would work well for Beavis and Butt-Head; eventually he concluded, "Maybe we should just actually make some good Beavis and Butt-Head episodes." Later, a Lady Gaga video convinced Van Toffler of the tenability of a Beavis and Butt-Head revival: "I felt like there was a whole crop of new artists—and what the world sorely missed was the point of view that only Beavis and Butt-Head could bring."

As part of a promotional campaign for the new series, cinemas screening Jackass 3D opened the feature film with a 3-D Beavis and Butt-Head short subject. Months later, in a media presentation on February 2, 2011, MTV announced that the series would premiere in mid-2011. On July 21, 2011, Judge spoke and fielded questions on a panel at Comic-Con International. A preview of the episode "Holy Cornholio" was also shown. Judge told Rolling Stone that at least 24 episodes (12 half-hour programs) will definitely air.

The new episodes debuted in the United States and Canada on October 27, 2011. Conflicting with the actual season number, MTV incorrectly refers to this season as "Season 9", even though it is technically the eighth season. The premiere was dubbed a ratings hit with an audience of 3.3 million total viewers. This number eventually dwindled to 900,000 by the season's end, mainly due to its challenging time slot pitted against regular prime time shows on other networks. According to Mike Judge, MTV's modern demographic are females 12–14 years old.

On July 28, 2016, it was reported that VH1 Classic was to be rebranded as MTV Classic on August 1, 2016, on the 35th anniversary of the original MTV. With a focus on 1990s programming, Beavis and Butt-Head were a major part of this alongside Daria and Æon Flux at the launch; they were also a major focus in the promotion of the re-brand. MTV Classic only broadcast episodes from the 2011 reboot. However, it and all non-music video programming only lasted a few months before being pulled.

2022: Second film and revival
In May 2008, Judge stated that he previously hated the idea of producing a live-action film, but had come to believe that "maybe there's something there." He also revealed that Johnny Depp had expressed interest in the role of Beavis, having imitated the character while Marlon Brando imitated Butt-Head during the production of Don Juan DeMarco (1995). He also stated in an interview that "Seann William Scott's kinda got Butt-Head eyes." In 2016, Judge told Radio Times "Maybe it could be a live-action someday", then went on to speculate that Beavis might be homeless by now.

In August 2009, Judge stated, "I like to keep the door open on Beavis and Butt-Head, because it's my favorite thing that I've ever done. It's the thing I'm most proud of." While promoting his film Extract that month, Judge said he would like to see the characters on the big screen again, and that "I kind of think of them as being either 15 or in their 60s.... I wouldn't mind doing something with them as these two dirty old men sitting on the couch."

On January 10, 2014, Judge announced that, while he was busy working on Silicon Valley, there was a chance of his pitching Beavis and Butt-Head to another network and that he would not mind making more episodes. During an interview with Howard Stern on May 6, 2014, Judge mentioned that the show's ratings on MTV were second only to Jersey Shore, but the show did not fit MTV's target demographic of young women, which is why the revived series has not been brought back on MTV. He also said that MTV was close to selling it to another network, but it became "lost in deal stuff".

On July 1, 2020, Comedy Central announced it had ordered a second revival of the series consisting of two new seasons along with spin-offs and specials. In the new series, Beavis and Butt-Head will enter a "whole new Gen Z world" with meta-themes that are said to be relatable to both new fans, who may be unfamiliar with the original series, and old. Mike Judge would return as the writer, producer, and principal voice actor for the series.

In February 2022, it was announced that the revival would instead premiere on Paramount+, following a second Beavis and Butt-Head feature film entitled Beavis and Butt-Head Do the Universe. Originally, Paramount executives wanted a live-action Beavis and Butt-Head movie. Judge held auditions over Zoom for the project. He eventually talked the company into doing an animated movie instead to reestablish the characters first, with a future live-action movie still a possibility. In June 2022, it was confirmed that new episodes would debut later that year, along with the full library of over 227 original episodes, newly remastered, with music videos intact. One month later, it was announced that the revival would premiere on August 4, 2022. Season 9 continues the concept of the Beavis and Butt-Head multiverse initially explored in Beavis and Butt-Head Do the Universe. Teenage Beavis and Butt-Head, Old Beavis and Butt-Head, and Smart Beavis and Butt-Head all get their own dedicated episodes in the revival.

On March 8, 2023, Paramount+ announced that the series would return with a new season set to premiere April 20, 2023.

Episodes

Reception

During its original run, Beavis and Butt-Head was MTV's highest rated show. It was one of the most popular series when it premiered in 1993.

Over its run, Beavis and Butt-Head received both positive and negative reactions from the public with its combination of lewd humor and implied criticism of society. It became the focus of criticism from some social critics such as Michael Medved, while others such as David Letterman and the National Review defended it as a cleverly subversive vehicle for social criticism and a particularly creative and intelligent comedy. Either way, the show captured the attention of many young television viewers and is often considered a classic piece of 1990s youth culture and Generation X. Trey Parker and Matt Stone, creators of South Park, cite the series as an influence and compared it to the blues.

In 1997, Dan Tobin of The Boston Phoenix commented on the series' humor, saying it transformed "stupidity into a crusade, forcing us to acknowledge how little it really takes to make us laugh." In 1997, Ted Drozdowski of The Boston Phoenix described the 1997 Beavis and Butt-Head state as "reduced to self-parody of their self-parody". In the Baltimore Sun, David Zurawik said that Beavis and Butt-Head was "intelligent social satire that especially speaks in a meaningful way to a generation of teenage boys who are going through a uniquely complicated socialization at the hands of their baby-boomer parents". He said that its popularity may have taught audiences about male adolescence in the 1990s; he wrote that they were the postmodern descendents of Tom Sawyer and Huckleberry Finn, who were the "exemplars of males coming of age in American popular culture".

In December 2005, TV Guide ranked the duo's distinct laughing at #66 on their list of the 100 Greatest TV Quotes and Catchphrases. In 2012, TV Guide ranked Beavis and Butt-Head as one of the top 60 Greatest TV Cartoons of All Time.

Controversies
The show was blamed for the death of two-year-old Jessica Matthews in Moraine, Ohio, in October 1993. The girl's five-year-old brother, Austin Messner, set fire to his mother's mobile home with a cigarette lighter, killing the two-year-old. The mother later claimed that her son watched an episode in which the characters said "fire was fun". However, the neighbors stated that the family did not even have cable television and would thus be unable to view the show.

As a result, all references to fire were removed from subsequent airings and prompted the show to a later time slot. The creators found a censorship loophole and took delight in sometimes making Beavis scream things that sounded very similar to his previous "Fire! Fire!" (such as "Fryer! Fryer!" when he and Butt-Head are working the late shift at Burger World) and also having him almost say the forbidden word (such as one time when he sang "Liar, liar, pants on..." and pausing before "fire"). There was also a music video where a man runs on fire in slow motion ("California" by Wax). Beavis is hypnotized by it and can barely say "fire". However, MTV eventually removed the episode entirely. References to fire were cut from earlier episodes—even the original master tapes were altered permanently. Other episodes MTV opted not to rerun included "Stewart's House" and "Way Down Mexico Way". Copies of early episodes with the controversial content intact are rare, and the copies that exist are made from home video recordings of the original broadcasts, typically on VCR. In an interview included with the Mike Judge Collection DVD set, Judge said he is uncertain whether some of the earlier episodes still exist in their original, uncensored form.

When the series returned in 2011, MTV allowed Beavis to use the word "fire" once again uncensored. During the first video segment, "Werewolves of Highland", the first new episode of the revival, Beavis utters the word "fire" a total of seven times within 28 seconds, with Butt-Head saying it once as well.

In February 1994, watchdog group Morality in Media claimed that the death of eight-month-old Natalia Rivera, struck by a bowling ball thrown from an overpass onto a highway in Jersey City, New Jersey, near the Holland Tunnel by 18-year-old Calvin J. Settle, was partially inspired by Beavis and Butt-Head. The group said that Settle was influenced by the episode "Ball Breakers", in which Beavis and Butt-Head load a bowling ball with explosives and drop it from a rooftop. While Morality in Media claimed that the show inspired Settle's actions, the case's prosecutors did not. It was later revealed by both prosecutors and the defendant that Settle did not have cable TV, nor did he watch the show.

MTV also responded by broadcasting the program after 11:00 p.m. and included a disclaimer, reminding viewers:
Beavis and Butt-Head are not real. They are stupid cartoon people completely made up by this Texas guy whom we hardly even know. Beavis and Butt-Head are dumb, crude, thoughtless, ugly, sexist, self-destructive fools. But for some reason, the little wienerheads make us laugh.
This was later changed to:
Beavis and Butt-Head are not role models. They're not even human. They're cartoons. Some of the things they do would cause a person to get hurt, expelled, arrested, possibly deported. To put it another way: don't try this at home.
This disclaimer also appears before the opening of their Sega Genesis and Super NES games as well as their Windows game Beavis and Butt-Head in Virtual Stupidity.

They were famously lambasted by Democratic South Carolina Senator Fritz Hollings as "Buffcoat and Beaver". This subsequently became a running gag on the show where adults mispronounced their names. For example, one character on the show, Tom Anderson, originally called them "Butthole" and "Joe" and believed the two to be of Asian ethnicity (describing them to the police as "Oriental"). In later episodes, Anderson uses the Hollings mispronunciation once and, on at least one occasion, refers to them as "Penis and Butt-Munch". President Clinton called them "Beavis and Bum-head" in "Citizen Butt-head", as well as in the movie, where an old lady (voiced by Cloris Leachman) consistently calls them "Travis" and "Bob-head". In "Incognito", when another student threatens to kill them, the duo uses this to their advantage, pretending to be exchange students named "Crevis and Bung-Head". The bully, seeing through the disguises, calls them "Beaver and Butt-Plug". In "Right On!", when the duo appear on the Gus Baker Show, host Gus Baker (a caricature of Rush Limbaugh) introduces them as "Beavis and Buffcoat". And in the original series finale, "Beavis and Butt-head Are Dead", a news reporter refers to the two boys as "Brevis and Head-Butt". In the Season 9 episode "Locked Out" Tom Anderson mistakes Beavis and Butthead for honest and responsible boys, and blames "Buford" and "Bernardo" for the alleged damage to the paint on his new truck, though Beavis and Butthead lied about the damage.

Beavis and Butt-Head have been compared to idiot savants because of their creative and subversively intelligent observations of music videos. This part of the show was mostly improvised by Mike Judge. With regard to criticisms of the two as "idiots", Judge responded that a show about straight-A students would not be funny.

Guinness World Records
On September 25, 2022, Beavis and Butt-Head and Paramount+ attempted to break the largest plate of nachos at S. Alameda St in Los Angeles to celebrate the return of the show. They were successful and were given a ceremonial plaque from the Guinness World Records representative which stated "The largest serving of nachos was achieved by Mike Judge's Beavis and Butt-Head and Paramount+."

Related media

Daria

A spin-off based on classmate Daria Morgendorffer premiered in 1997. Mike Judge was not involved at all except to give permission for use of the character (created by Glenn Eichler and designed by Bill Peckmann). The only reference to the original show is Daria's mentioning that Lawndale cannot be a second Highland "unless there's uranium in the drinking water here too".

Video games
 MTV's Beavis and Butt-Head, a set of games released by Viacom New Media for the Game Gear, Genesis and Super NES in 1994. All three games featured music composed by Gwar.
 Talking MTV's Beavis and Butt-Head: This Game Rules!!!, a handheld LCD video game released by Tiger Electronics in 1994.
 Beavis and Butt-Head in Virtual Stupidity, a graphic adventure game released for Windows 95 in 1995. A PlayStation port was released exclusively in Japan in 1998 featuring dubbed voice acting by Atsushi Tamura and Ryō Tamura from Owarai duo London Boots Ichi-gō Ni-gō.
 Beavis and Butt-Head in Calling All Dorks, a collection of desktop themes for Windows 95 released in 1995 by Viacom New Media.
 Beavis and Butt-Head in Wiener Takes All, a Beavis and Butt-Head-themed trivia game by Viacom New Media. Released as a PC/Macintosh-compatible CD-ROM in 1996.
 Beavis and Butt-Head in Little Thingies, a mini-game collection released for Windows 95 in 1996 featuring four mini-games from the previously released Virtual Stupidity and three new ones.
 Beavis and Butt-Head, a coin-operated video game developed by Atari Games for a 3DO Interactive Multiplayer-based hardware. The game underwent location testing 1996, but was unreleased due to poor reception.
 Beavis and Butt-Head in Screen Wreckers, a collection of screensavers released for Windows 95 in 1997.
 Beavis and Butt-Head: Bunghole in One, a Beavis and Butt-Head-themed golf video game released for Windows 95 by GT Interactive in 1998.
 Beavis and Butt-Head, an overhead action game released by GT Interactive for the Game Boy in 1998.
 Beavis and Butt-Head Do Hollywood (originally Beavis and Butt-Head: Get Big in Hollywood), an unreleased 3D action game that was being produced by GT Interactive. It was announced for the PlayStation in 1998.
 Beavis and Butt-Head Do U., a graphic adventure game released by GT Interactive for Windows 95 in 1999.

Books

 
 
 
 
 
 
 
 
 
 
 
 
 
  (NOTE: This book is a bundle of four previous books 'Ensucklopedia,' 'Huh Huh for Hollywood,' 'The Butt-Files,' and 'Chicken Soup for the Butt' which are no longer in print separately).

Album
A CD, The Beavis and Butt-Head Experience, was released featuring many hard rock and heavy metal bands such as Megadeth, Primus, Nirvana and White Zombie. Moreover, Beavis and Butt-Head do a duet with Cher on "I Got You Babe" and a track by themselves called "Come to Butt-Head". The track with Cher also resulted in a music video directed by Tamra Davis and Yvette Kaplan.

Chart success

The Beavis and Butt-Head duet with Cher on "I Got You Babe" was released as a single in the UK, Australia, Europe and the US, the UK CD had a special limited edition sticker to promote The Beavis and Butt-Head Experience available with the release. On January 15, 1994, the song charted at number 35 in the UK charts and stayed on the charts for 4 weeks. On December 4, 1993, the song charted on the Billboard Bubbling Under Hot 100 chart in the US peaking at number 8.

The single also charted at number 69 in Australia, 19 in Belgium, 18 in Denmark, 69 on the European Hot 100, 9 on the Netherlands Dutch Top 40, 10 on the Netherlands top 100 and number 40 in Sweden.

Slot game
In 2019, Gauselmann Group's UK-based games studio Blueprint Gaming launched the Beavis and Butt-Head online slot game. The game features moments and scenes from the TV show and film.

The branded game was among the 10 most exposed slot games in UK online casinos days after its release in late May 2019.

References

External links
 
 
 

Beavis and Butt-Head
1990s American adult animated television series
1990s American animated comedy television series
1990s American high school television series
1990s American satirical television series
1990s American sitcoms
1993 American television series debuts
1997 American television series endings
2010s American adult animated television series
2010s American animated comedy television series
2010s American high school television series
2010s American satirical television series
2010s American sitcoms
2011 American television series debuts
2011 American television series endings
2020s American adult animated television series
2020s American animated comedy television series
2020s American high school television series
2020s American satirical television series
2020s American sitcoms
2022 American television series debuts
American adult animated comedy television series
American adult animated television spin-offs
American animated sitcoms
American television series revived after cancellation
American television series with live action and animation
Animated duos
Animated satirical television series
Animation controversies in television
Censored television series
Comics based on television series
English-language television shows
Fictional duos
Juvenile delinquency in fiction
Liquid Television
MTV cartoons
Marvel Comics titles
Paramount+ original programming
Teen animated television series
Television controversies in the United States
Television duos
Television series by Paramount Television
Television series by 3 Arts Entertainment
Television series by Film Roman
Television series by Rough Draft Studios
Television series created by Mike Judge
Television shows adapted into comics
Television shows adapted into films
Television shows adapted into video games
Television shows set in Texas
Virginity in television